The women's 4×100 metre medley relay event at the 2000 Summer Olympics took place on 22–23 September at the Sydney International Aquatic Centre in Sydney, Australia.

The U.S. women's team established a new world record to defend their Olympic title in the event for the third consecutive streak. Leading the race from the start, Barbara Bedford (1:01.39), Megan Quann (1:06.29), Jenny Thompson (57.25), and Dara Torres (53.37) put together in a sterling time of 3:58.30 to clear the four-minute barrier and to smash China's six-year-old world record by 3.37 seconds. Capturing another relay title for the Americans, Thompson also picked up her eighth gold medal and tenth career as the nation's most successful female athlete in Olympic history.

The Aussie team of Dyana Calub (1:01.83), Leisel Jones (1:08.08), Petria Thomas (57.39), and Susie O'Neill (54.29) finished behind their greatest rivals by over three seconds, but powered home with the silver in an Oceanian record of 4:01.59. Meanwhile, Japan's Mai Nakamura (1:02.08), Masami Tanaka (1:08.65), Junko Onishi (58.72), and Sumika Minamoto (54.71) moved from fifth at the start to produce a spectacular fashion for the bronze in a national record of 4:04.16, holding off a mighty German team of Antje Buschschulte (1:02.05), Sylvia Gerasch (1:08.67), Franziska van Almsick (59.67), and Katrin Meissner (54.04) by 17-hundredths of a second, a time of 4:04.33.

South Africa's Charlene Wittstock (1:02.74), Sarah Poewe (1:07.83), Mandy Loots (59.81), and Helene Muller (54.77) established an African standard to strike the field with a fifth-place effort in 4:05.15. Canada (4:07.55), Great Britain (4:07.61), and China (4:07.83) completed a close finish at the rear of the championship finale.

Records
Prior to this competition, the existing world and Olympic records were as follows.

The following new world and Olympic records were set during this competition.

Results

Heats

Final

References

External links
Official Olympic Report

M
4 × 100 metre medley relay
2000 in women's swimming
Women's events at the 2000 Summer Olympics